Gongylus trachelophyllus is an praying mantis in the family Empusidae which is characterized by extremely slender limbs with large appendages.

Range
They are found in the Chota Nagpur Plateau region covering Bihar and Odisha states of India.

Etymology
Its generic name Gongylus means "roundish" in Greek.

References

External links

Mantodea of Asia
Empusidae
Insects of India
Insects described in 1838